Matt Valerio, better known by his stage name Bomarr (formerly The Bomarr Monk), is an alternative hip hop producer based in San Francisco, California. He is a member of Restiform Bodies along with Passage and Telephone Jim Jesus.

History
Bomarr released the album Moods & Symptoms with Passage in 2000. Throughout the production of the album, They formed Restiform Bodies with Telephone Jim Jesus in New London, New Hampshire.

Bomarr sent the demo to Anticon and the trio moved to San Francisco in 2001.

Remixes Vol. 1 was released in 2011. It is a compilation of the remixes Bomarr has done for Tunng, Sister Crayon, Pedestrian among others between 2005 and 2010.

Discography

Solo
 Beats Being Broke (2002)
 Surface Sincerity (2003)
 Fetal Antiseptic Drama Party (2003)
 Surface Sincerity Soundtrack (2004)
 Freedom from Frightened Air (2007)
 Scraps (2007)
 iPhone Beats (2008)
 Remixes Vol. 1 (2011)
 Apparitions (2014)
 Ready For My Ride (2015)
 Steamroller (2015)

Passage & The Bomarr Monk
 Moods & Symptoms (2000)

Telephone Jim Jesus & The Bomarr Monk
 Live at the Chapel of the Chimes (2006)

Restiform Bodies
 Restiform Bodies (2001)
 TV Loves You Back (2008)

References

External links
 Official website
 Discography

Year of birth missing (living people)
Anticon artists
American hip hop record producers
Businesspeople from San Francisco
Living people
Record producers from California